Charlotte Weiss (1870 Basel -1961 Herrliberg) was a Swiss painter.

References
This article was initially translated from the German Wikipedia.
 SIKART Lexicon on Art in Switzerland http://www.sikart.ch/kuenstlerinnen.aspx?id=4024768

19th-century Swiss painters
20th-century Swiss painters
Swiss women painters
1870 births
1961 deaths